Skunk clownfish is used to refer to several species of anemonefish that are visually similar and form a species complex:
Pink skunk clownfish
Orange skunk clownfish
Nosestripe clownfish